William Hilliard may refer to:

 William Hilliard (bishop) (1887–1960), Anglican bishop of Nelson
 William Hilliard (English MP) (died 1608), English Member of Parliament
 William Hilliard (Florida politician), served as Mayor of Tallahassee
 William Hilliard (publisher) (1778–1836), American publisher and bookseller in Massachusetts
 William A. Hilliard (1927–2017), American journalist
 William L. Hilliard (1868–1966), Canadian physician and politician in Ontario